On the Divide is a short story by Willa Cather. It was first published in Overland Monthly in January 1896.

Plot summary
On the Nebraska prairie, Canute takes to drinking to forget his boredom after spending the first forty years of his life in Sweden. Lena takes to teasing him and going to church with him. One day, he asks her father if he can marry her and the father says no. He then proceeds to drag Lena to his house by force, drag a priest there by force too, and get him to marry them without the girl or the girl's father's consent. Later the priest leaves and Lena is left alone in Canute's shanty. She is scared of the rattlesnakes and the coyotes, but he stays outside, in the snow. As she opens the door he is sobbing.

Characters
Canute Canuteson
Jim Peterson
Ole Yensen
Mary Lee Yensen, Ole's wife.
Lena Yensen, Ole and Mary's daughter.
Anne Hermanson
Sorenson

Allusions to other works
Milton, Dante, The Bible, especially Eden, are mentioned.

Literary significance and criticism
On the Divide was Cather's first story to be published in a national magazine. In a 1938 letter to Edward Wagenknetch, Willa Cather admitted that On the Divide was retouched by one of her professors and submitted for publication without her consent.

The story bears similarities with O Pioneers!. Moreover, it has been noted that Cather's spare style parallels the harshness of the landscape.

References

External links
Full Text at the Willa Cather Archive

1896 short stories
Short stories by Willa Cather
Works originally published in Overland Monthly